Mark Vervoort (born 7 October 1990) is a Dutch tennis player playing on the ATP Challenger Tour. On 21 May 2012, he reached his highest ATP singles ranking of 814 and his highest doubles ranking of 116 achieved on 29 August 2016.

Challenger and Futures finals

Doubles: 48 (22–26)

External links 
 
 

1990 births
Living people
Dutch male tennis players